Thomas Duncombe (baptised 27 August 1724 – 23 November 1779) was a British politician who sat in the House of Commons between 1751 and 1779.

Duncombe  was the eldest  son of Thomas Duncombe, of Duncombe Park, North Yorkshire and his wife, Mary Slingsby, daughter of Sir Thomas Slingsby. He was educated at Westminster School from an early age in 1732, and matriculated at Christ Church, Oxford on 18 May 1742, aged 17. He succeeded his father to Duncombe Park in 1746 and is also known as Thomas Duncombe III.

In 1751, Duncombe was returned  as Member of Parliament for the Downton constituency. In 1754 he was elected MP for Morpeth. On the death of his cousin  Lord Feversham in 1763 he inherited an interest at Downton, and in 1768 was returned to Parliament unopposed.  In 1774 his control of the Downton seat was challenged  and he was unseated on petition.  He was returned unopposed for Downton in 1779, but died a few weeks later on 23 November 1779. There is no record of his having spoken in Parliament.

Family
Duncombe married firstly Lady Diana Howard (1723-1770) daughter of Henry Howard, 4th Earl of Carlisle  on  9 February 1749. Their daughter Anne married Robert Shafto.

He married secondly Anne Jennings (1749-1777), daughter of Sir Philip Jennings Clerke, Bt  on 24 February 1772. Their daughter Frances (1775-1861) married George Henry Rose and was mother to Hugh Rose, 1st Baron Strathnairn, Sir William Rose and the Countess of Morton.

He married thirdly  Charlotte Hale, daughter of William Hale of King's Walden, Hertfordshire on 25 June 1778.

Having no sons, Duncombe's estates at Barford, near Downton and Duncombe Park devolved to his younger brother Charles Slingsby Duncombe and thence to Charles Duncombe, 1st Baron Feversham.

References

Sources
 History of the Cases of Controverted Elections: Which Were Tried and Determined During the First and Second Sessions of the Fourteenth Parliament of Great Britain, 15 & 16 Geo. III. Sylvester Douglas Baron Glenbervie L. Hansard, 1802 P207-239

1724 births
1779 deaths
People educated at Westminster School, London
Alumni of Christ Church, Oxford
Members of the Parliament of Great Britain for English constituencies
British MPs 1754–1761
British MPs 1761–1768
British MPs 1768–1774
British MPs 1774–1780